Giuseppe Picano (1716 – 1810) was an Italian sculptor.

Picano was born in Sant'Elia Fiumerapido. Trained by Luigi Vanvitelli and Carlo Vanvitelli, he collaborated with Giuseppe Sanmartino as well as working independently. He mainly worked on religious themes in marble, terracotta, stucco, wood, papier-mâché and other materials. He mainly produced artworks for churches and individuals in his birthplace and in Campania.

References

Bibliography (in Italian) 
 Antonio Lanni, Guida storica-turistica-commerciale di Sant'Elia Fiumerapido. Editore LAPI sas, Arti Grafiche Carmanica Marina di Minturno (LT) 1999
 Giovanni Petrucci, Vincenzo Pomella, Arpinate stampa s.r.l., Arpino febbraio 1979.
 Santelia Fiumerapido, CD-ROM edited by Bassa Ciociaria progetto Open Toor

18th-century Italian sculptors
19th-century Italian sculptors
1716 births
1810 deaths
People from the Province of Frosinone